Vapors of Morphine is an American rock band founded in 2009 by the remaining members of the alternative rock band Morphine, saxophonist Dana Colley and drummer Jerome Deupree, along with blues guitarist Jeremy Lyons. Jerome stepped down in early 2019; Tom Arey (Peter Wolf, Ghosts of Jupiter) has taken his place.

History
The band was officially formed in 2009, when Dana Colley was asked to bring a group to Nel Nome Del Rock Festival in Palestrina, Italy. Ten years earlier, Morphine's frontman Mark Sandman had suddenly died of a massive heart attack while performing in that venue.

After some deliberation, Colley invited Jeremy Lyons to sing and play the 2-string slide bass, along with drummer Jerome Deupree. Lyons asked friend "Washtub" Robbie Phillips to build a 2-string bass for him and started learning the Morphine repertoire. The process wasn't easy as Lyons had to master a new instrument while singing below his natural vocal range.

In the beginning, they couldn't agree on a name, and they alternated between “Members of Morphine & Jeremy Lyons” and the “Elastic Waste Band,” which eventually morphed into “The Ever Expanding Elastic Waste Band”. Early in 2014 someone asked Lyons if he didn't “play with ... the ‘vapors’ of Morphine?”, inspiring the band's name as it is currently known.

Vapors of Morphine have toured through the United States, South America, Europe and Russia. Some highlights have been successful European and South American tours in 2017 and '18; Mês Da Cultura Independente (São Paulo, Brazil, 2014), The New Orleans Jazz & Heritage Festival (USA, 2012); Virada Cultural Festival in Sao Paulo, Brazil (2012), New Orleans’ Voodoo Experience (USA, 2011); and Maquinaria Festival in Santiago, Chile (2011).

Former Morphine drummer Billy Conway has played as a guest, filling in for Deupree or making the group a quartet. Studio drummer Jeff Allison filled in as drummer in 2012 when Deupree was suffering from tendonitis.

A week after returning from Europe in November, 2018, Deupree informed his bandmates of his decision to leave the band, partly due to issues with tinnitus. He will be appearing on their upcoming album release, alongside Tom Arey.

Discography

 The Ever Expanding Elastic Waste Band (as Members of Morphine and Jeremy Lyons)
 A New Low (2016)

References

External links
Vapors of Morphine's Official Website

Musical groups established in 2009
Musical groups from Massachusetts
Alternative rock groups from Massachusetts